Celiptera virginiae is a moth of the family Erebidae. It is found in Bolivia.

References

Moths described in 2003
Celiptera
Moths of South America